The Sinulog Idol, a singing competition, is an annual event celebrated in Cebu every January, in time for the feast of Sr. Sto. Nino. The festival is considered one of the biggest in the country, features several activities. Sinulog Idol is a joint project of the Cebu  city government, Sinulog Foundation Inc., the Center for Pop Music Philippines, and Soundtraxx Production Studio.

Music festivals in the Philippines
Singing competitions